Colaxes is a genus of jumping spiders that was first described by Eugène Louis Simon in 1900.

Species
 it contains four species, found only in India, Sri Lanka, and South Africa:
Colaxes benjamini Wesolowska & Haddad, 2013 – South Africa
Colaxes horton Benjamin, 2004 – Sri Lanka
Colaxes nitidiventris Simon, 1900 (type) – India
Colaxes wanlessi Benjamin, 2004 – Sri Lanka

References

Salticidae
Salticidae genera
Spiders of Asia
Spiders of South Africa